Debbie Allen is a former state legislator in Colorado. She was elected to the Colorado House of Representatives in 1992 and served until 2000. She was a Republican.

She chaired the education committee.

She served in Colorado House District 43. She was succeeded by Frank Weddig.

References

20th-century American women politicians
20th-century American politicians
21st-century American women politicians
21st-century American politicians
Republican Party members of the Colorado House of Representatives
Year of birth missing (living people)
Living people
Place of birth missing (living people)